According to the CIA World Factbook, Muslims make up almost 100 percent of the population of the Western Sahara.

See also
 Islam by country

References